Timotheus Kirchner (6 January 1533 in Döllstädt – 14 September 1587 in Weimar) was a Lutheran theologian, pastor, Protestant reformer, professor of theology and superintendent in Weimar.

Life
Kirchner was the son of a teacher. He attended school in Gotha, studied in Jena and Erfurt, and was the village priest at a young age.

References

Kolb, Robert Bound Choice, Election, and Wittenberg Theological Method Eerdmans Publishing, 2005 pg. 125ff

1533 births
1587 deaths
16th-century German Protestant theologians
16th-century German Lutheran clergy
German Lutheran theologians
German male non-fiction writers
People from Gotha (district)
16th-century German male writers